In 2002, the United States Department of Justice, under the Sherman Antitrust Act, began a probe into the activities of dynamic random-access memory (DRAM) manufacturers in response to claims by US computer makers, including Dell and Gateway, that inflated DRAM pricing was causing lost profits and hindering their effectiveness in the marketplace.

To date, five manufacturers have pleaded guilty to their involvement in an international price-fixing conspiracy between July 1, 1998, and June 15, 2002, including Hynix, Infineon, Micron Technology, Samsung, and Elpida.

2002-2005 
"In December 2003, the Department charged Alfred P. Censullo, a Regional Sales Manager for Micron Technology Inc., with obstruction of justice in violation of 18 U.S.C. § 1503. Censullo pleaded guilty to the charge and admitted to having withheld and altered documents responsive to a grand jury subpoena served on Micron in June 2002."

On 20 October 2004, Infineon also pleaded guilty. The company was fined US$160M for its involvement, then the third largest antitrust fine in US history. In April 2005, Hynix Semiconductor was fined US$185M after they also admitted guilt. In October 2005, Samsung entered a guilty plea in connection with the cartel.

On 5 April 2006, Sun Woo Lee, Senior Manager of DRAM at Samsung Electronics, entered into a plea bargain with the US Government for his involvement in the price fixing conspiracy. Following the plea agreement he was sentenced to 8 months in prison and fined US$250,000. Lee was subsequently promoted to President of Samsung Germany in 2009, and then President of Samsung Europe in 2014.

On 19 May, 2010, European antitrust regulators also fined nine semiconductor manufacturers more than €331 million for the cartel that operated back in 2002. The companies fined are Samsung Electronics, Infineon, Hynix Semiconductor, Elpida Memory, NEC Electronics, Hitachi, Toshiba, Mitsubishi Electric and Nanya Technology. Micron Technology received immunity for blowing the whistle on the cartel and will not be fined for its involvement.

2017-2018 
On 27 April 2018, Hagens Berman filed a class-action lawsuit against Samsung, Hynix, and Micron in U.S. District Court alleging the trio engaged in DRAM price fixing causing prices to skyrocket through 2016 and 2017. Between June 2016 and January 2018, the price of DRAM nearly tripled.

References

External links
 Four Infineon Technologies Executives Agree to Plead Guilty in International DRAM Price-Fixing Conspiracy
 Korean Company Hynix Agrees to Plead Guilty to Price Fixing

Anti-competitive practices
Cartels
Price fixing convictions